

By decade 
 List of Portuguese films of the 1930s
 List of Portuguese films of the 1940s
 List of Portuguese films of the 1950s
 List of Portuguese films of the 1960s
 List of Portuguese films of the 1970s
 List of Portuguese films of the 1980s
 List of Portuguese films of the 1990s
 List of Portuguese films of the 2000s
 List of Portuguese films of the 2010s

By year 
 List of Portuguese films of 2000
 List of Portuguese films of 2001
 List of Portuguese films of 2002
 List of Portuguese films of 2003
 List of Portuguese films of 2004
 List of Portuguese films of 2005
 List of Portuguese films of 2006
 List of Portuguese films of 2007
 List of Portuguese films of 2008
 List of Portuguese films of 2009
 List of Portuguese films of 2010
 List of Portuguese films of 2011
 List of Portuguese films of 2012
 List of Portuguese films of 2013
 List of Portuguese films of 2014
 List of Portuguese films of 2015
 List of Portuguese films of 2016
 List of Portuguese films of 2017
 List of Portuguese films of 2018
 List of Portuguese films of 2019
 List of Portuguese films of 2020
 List of Portuguese films of 2021
 List of Portuguese films of 2022

Other lists 
 List of highest-grossing Portuguese films
 List of Portuguese submissions for the Academy Award for Best Foreign Language Film